Daniel Puckel (December 28, 1932 – November 13, 2018) was an American sports shooter. He competed in three events at the 1960 Summer Olympics.

References

1932 births
2018 deaths
American male sport shooters
Olympic shooters of the United States
Shooters at the 1960 Summer Olympics
People from Moline, Illinois
Sportspeople from Illinois
Pan American Games medalists in shooting
Pan American Games gold medalists for the United States
Pan American Games silver medalists for the United States
Shooters at the 1959 Pan American Games
20th-century American people